Saint-Paul-en-Jarez is a commune in the Loire department in central France.

Geography
The Dorlay river, a tributary of the Gier that rises in the Pilat massif, flows through the commune.

Population

Twin towns
Saint-Paul-en-Jarez is twinned with:

  Herbertingen, Germany

See also
Communes of the Loire department

References

Communes of Loire (department)